Burmagomphus laidlawi is a species of dragonfly in the family Gomphidae. It is known only from the high altitude regions of Western Ghats of India.

Description and habitat
It is a medium-sized dragonfly with bottle-green eyes. Its thorax is black, marked with greenish-yellow ante-humeral stripes. Sides are greenish-yellow, marked with two narrow black stripes. Wings are transparent, slightly tinted with yellow at bases. Abdomen is black, marked with yellow. Segment 1 and 2 have broad dorsal stripes, and its sides. Segment 3 has a mid-dorsal carina of yellow, and a large baso-lateral spot. Segment 4 to 6 have basal dorsal triangular spots and baso-lateral lunules. Segment 7 has a broad basal ring. Segment 8 is unmarked. Segment 9 has its apical half yellow. Segment 10 is unmarked. Anal
appendages are black. Female is similar to the male.

It breeds in montane forest streams and rivers.

See also
 List of odonates of India
 List of odonata of Kerala

References

Gomphidae
Insects described in 1924